Dendropsophus padreluna is a species of frog in the family Hylidae. It is endemic to Colombia, being only known from its type locality in Albán, Cundinamarca Department.

These frogs live in shrubs in flooded grassland, pastures, marshes, and temporary pools. Despite its limited distribution, Dendropsophus padreluna is an abundant species and it is not considered threatened.

References

padreluna
Amphibians of Colombia
Endemic fauna of Colombia
Amphibians described in 1997
Taxonomy articles created by Polbot